A zemstvo (plural zemstva – ) was an institution of local government set up during the great emancipation reform of 1861 carried out in Imperial Russia by Emperor Alexander II of Russia. Nikolay Milyutin elaborated the idea of the zemstva, and the first zemstvo laws went into effect in 1864. After the October Revolution  the zemstvo system was shut down by the Bolsheviks and replaced with a multilevel system of workers' and peasants' councils ("soviets").

Structure
The system of elected bodies of local self-government in the Russian Empire was represented at the lowest level by the mir and the volost and was continued, so far as the 34 Guberniyas (governorates) of old Russia were concerned, in the elective district and provincial assemblies (zemstvo). The goal of the zemstvo reform was the creation of local organs of self-government on an elected basis, possessing sufficient authority and independence to resolve local economic problems. 

Alexander II instituted these bodies, one for each district and another for each province or government, in 1864. They consisted of a representative council (zemskoye sobranye) and of an executive board (zemskaya uprava) nominated by the former. The board consisted of five classes of members:
 large landed proprietors [nobles owning  and over], who sat in person
 delegates of the small landowners, including the clergy in their capacity of landed proprietors
 delegates of the wealthier townsmen
 delegates of the less wealthy urban classes
 delegates of the peasants, elected by the volosts

The nobles received more weight in voting for a zemstvo, as evidenced by the fact that 74% of the zemstvo members were nobles, even though nobles were a tiny minority of the population. Even so, the zemstvo allowed the greater population to have a say in how a small part of their communities would operate.

In 1865 zemstvos were opened in nineteen provinces, and between 1866 and 1876 another sixteen were established. Twelve provinces had no zemstvos, the three Baltic provinces and the nine western governments annexed from Poland by Catherine II. Created in 1875 after much consultation with Cossack officials, the Zemstvos of the Don Host Oblast collapsed and were abolished after six years of operation.

The rules governing elections to the zemstvos were taken as a model for the electoral law of 1906 and are sufficiently indicated by the account of this given below. The zemstvos were originally given large powers in relation to the incidence of taxation and such questions as education, medical relief, public welfare, food supply, and road maintenance in their localities, but radicals, such as the Socialist Revolutionary Party and the nihilists, met them with hostility, believing that the reforms were too minor. These powers were, however, severely restricted by Alexander III (law of ); the zemstvos were then subordinated to the governors, whose consent was necessary for each decision. The governors had drastic powers of discipline over the members.

Despite all these restrictions, during the 50 years of the zemstvos, they succeeded in solving many problems of general education, public medical service, construction and maintenance of roads and sponsoring local economic development. The Zemstva hired professional experts from the Intelligentsia in aid of their activity, who came to be known as the 'third element'.  

Zemstvo expenditure grew from 89.1 million rubles in 1900 to 290.5 million rubles in 1913. Of the latter sum, 90.1 million rubles were spent on education, 71.4 million on medical assistance, 22.2 million on improvements in agriculture, and 8 million on veterinary measures. The chief sources of zemstvo revenue were rates on lands, forests, country dwellings, factories, mines and other real-estate.

Philately uses the term zemstvo stamp to refer to local-issue Russian postage stamps from this period.

All-Russian Zemstvo Union

The All-Russian Zemstvo Union was set up in August 1914 to provide a common voice for all the Zemstvos. It was a liberal organisation which after 1915 operated in conjunction with the Union of Cities.

References

Further reading
 Darrow, David W. "The Politics of Numbers: Zemstvo Land Assessment and the Conceptualization of Russia's Rural Economy." The Russian Review 59.1 (2000): 52-75.
 Emmons, Terence, and Wayne S. Vucinich, eds. The Zemstvo in Russia: An Experiment in Local Self-Government (Cambridge University Press, 1982) essays by scholars.
 Fallows, Thomas S. "The Russian Fronde and the Zemstvo Movement: Economic Agitation and Gentry Politics in the Mid-1890s." The Russian Review 44.2 (1985): 119-138. online
 Porter, Thomas, and William Gleason. "The 'Zemstvo' and Public Initiative in Late Imperial Russia." Russian History 21.4 (1994): 419-437. online
 Porter, Thomas Earl. The Zemstvo and the emergence of civil society in late imperial Russia 1864-1917'' (Edwin Mellen Press, 1991).

1864 establishments in the Russian Empire
1917 disestablishments in Russia
Forms of local government
Local government in the Russian Empire
Alexander II of Russia